Ah Boys to Men is a 2012 Singaporean military comedy film produced and directed by Jack Neo, written by Neo and Link Sng. It stars Joshua Tan, Maxi Lim, Noah Yap, Wang Weiliang, Tosh Zhang, Justin Dominic Misson, Aizuddiin Nasser and Ridhwan Azman in the first installment. The film is the first installment of the Ah Boys to Men series. The main plot revolves around a group of army recruits in National Service in Singapore. Neo had wanted to shoot an army-themed film since his army days, but could not find a suitable chance to do so. Ah Boys to Men is the first local film to be released in two parts and the first to film in Pulau Tekong, as well as the first South-East Asian film to feature Dolby Atmos surround sound. The film's theme song, "Recruits' Anthem" was written and composed by one of the cast, Tosh Zhang.

The film was released on 8 November 2012. It is the highest-grossing Singaporean film of all time, and has grossed over four times its S$3 million budget. Buoyed by audience demand, a third installment titled Ah Boys to Men 3: Frogmen was released on 19 February 2015. It features the same cast but is however not a sequel to Ah Boys to Men 2.

Plot
The film opens with Singapore apparently suffering a massive invasion, with iconic Singaporean landmarks attacked and numerous civilian casualties. It is later revealed that the war is the fictitious setting of a war-based role-playing game played by Ken Chow (Joshua Tan), a rich and spoiled teenager reluctant to be conscripted into National Service (NS). Ken planned to study abroad with his girlfriend Amy (Qiu Qiu), but is prevented from doing so by his upcoming compulsory military service. After being chided by Amy for his childishness, Ken vents his anger on a nearby rubbish bin, only to be apprehended by two nearby policemen to Amy's embarrassment and dismay.

After he is driven home by his father (Richard Low), Ken confides to his parents about his fears of NS. His overprotective mother (Irene Ang) decides to help him think of ways to defer his service, but fails. The Chow family sadly sends off Ken on the day of his recruitment. Thereafter, Ken and some other recruits are assigned to Ninja Company (Platoon 2, Section 2), sent to their bunk and then introduced to their Platoon Sergeant (Tosh Zhang). Whilst queueing up for the mandatory haircut, Ken meets some of his fellow recruits - "Lobang", (Wang Weiliang) a charismatic Ah Beng who's quick to make friends, Aloysius Jin Sia-lan, (Maxi Lim) an extremely educated fellow who intends to become an army officer and "I.P. Man", (Noah Yap) an Ah Beng scared of his girlfriend dumping him for being too busy serving NS. Most of the recruits are shown to make simple and goofy mistakes in their initial training.

After two weeks of training, Ken and the other recruits are allowed to book out for the first time. A lavish party is thrown by his family to celebrate Ken's return, but his mood is ruined when he is shown a photo of his girlfriend with another man. Ken angrily confronts her and demands that they meet, which she does not initially agree to. She later admits that she has fallen for another man and dumps Ken at a highway. Determined to regain her love, Ken devises a plan to escape from Pulau Tekong as he feels that she is merely testing him. Whilst undergoing military exercises in hot weather, Ken stops drinking water in an attempt to force a heat injury, for which he would be sent home for ten days; he takes the extra measure of sleeping under a ceiling fan after dousing himself in cold water. His condition rapidly deteriorates and he is hospitalised after collapsing during training. Ken's father is alerted of his son's critical condition while in a company meeting. He quickly drives off to the hospital, but the sheer shock and strain causes him to have a stroke while driving and violently collide with another vehicle.

Ken wakes up in a hospital, surrounded by his two sisters. He realises that his foolish actions have caused problems for many people and cannot bear to face his father, who has survived the car crash and is recuperating in another ward in the same hospital. Awakened to reality, Ken is finally fit enough to go back to training. The film ends at this junction, and snippets of the next part are shown.

Cast

Local YouTube personality Samuel Driscoll was approached to play an army boy, but declined as it was "not something that I'm ready to do".

Themes
The main theme of Ah Boys to Men is conscription in Singapore, a popular topic amongst Singaporeans. In conjunction with the Ministry of Defence's 2012 NS45 campaign, From Fathers to Sons, it is meant to commemorate the 45th anniversary of Singapore's National Service. Emotional issues that recruits experience for a long period of time, such as not being able to be that in touch with relatives are tackled in part one. It also pokes fun into many infamous incidents related to the Singapore Army by parodying these events. Derek Elley of Film Business Asia claims that the driving factor of Ah Boys to Men, National Service, is just a metaphor for the strict life in Singapore. The second part focuses more on the unity of the protagonists, as well as tapping more on hot social topics like foreign talent in Singapore. It gave "a stronger story than its predecessor", and had a "more meaty" drama aspect, according to Jack Neo. Other themes for part two include "[...] sacrifice, love, family and patriotism".

Production

Development
Ah Boys to Men is Jack Neo's first military-themed film, as well as his "most ambitious project so far" according to himself. Neo had wanted to shoot a military-themed film since his recruit days after being influenced by Taiwanese army films, but could not find the right opportunity. Neo was originally approached by the Ministry of Defence (MINDEF) to edit footages from the 2010 documentary Every Singaporean Son into a film. After much deliberation, Neo decided to not use the footage and instead write a brand new script. The production received the full support from MINDEF to shoot the film; they were provided access to vehicles, equipment and weapons as well as on-site consultants. Neo did not accept financial funding from MINDEF as he wanted to retain full control of the creative process. The film was funded under the Media Development Authority’s Production Assistance grant, and by investors and sponsors, some of which included Toast Box, Bee Cheng Hiang and KPMG.

Research for the film alone took around two and a half months. Neo said the decision to break the film into two parts was made after the distributors told him to keep the films 100 minutes in length, as any longer and it would have been more expensive and difficult to schedule.

With a budget of S$3 million, Ah Boys to Men is Singapore's most expensive film.

Casting
The crew employed a talent scout to find potential cast; casting began in March 2012. Additionally, an audition notice was uploaded on the production company's official website. JM Artiste Management – a collaboration between mm2 Entertainment and J Teams Productions – managed the cast. Neo initially wanted to include regulars like Shawn Lee and Joshua Ang, but ultimately decided not to, so as to give the audience a completely new feel. Approximately 500 auditioned for the lead roles. For this project, Neo wanted to work with bloggers and getai singers to create a new platform for acting. Many prominent businessmen in Singapore, such as Kenny Yap, executive chairman of Qian Hu Corporation, were also invited to make cameo appearances. The film marked the film debut for most of the lead cast, and it also resulted in a spike in their popularity, to the extent that "[...] getting mobbed by passionate fans has become part of their everyday life."

Crew
Ah Boys to Men was directed by Jack Neo and the script was written by Neo and Link Sng. Neo, Lim Teck, and Leonard Lai served as producers, while Neo's wife Irene Kng, along with Mang, Teck, Tengku Iesta, Tengku Alaudin, Kenny Chua, William Sin, Dominic Inn, Tan Tong Hai, Eric Liang and Sky Li Yunfei, served as executive producers.

Filming

As part of preparation for the film, the cast members underwent a two-day Basic Military Training familiarisation course, which was, to one of the stars, Tosh Zhang, "as tough as what we really went through during national service." Filming took place mostly in Pulau Tekong (which is used exclusively as a training base for various Singapore Army units and home to the Basic Military Training Centre), making Ah Boys to Men the first film to have filmed there. The "unpredictable" weather was a problem the crew encountered while filming at Tekong; 35 days were spent filming there. Other filming locations included Robinson Road, which was used for a major war scene and specially sealed off to the public for a day on August 19, 2012 so as to allow the crew to film; it was the first time it was closed for such reason. Neo was warned beforehand that destruction of the road incur fines.

A certain fight scene set in a restaurant, which involved ten actors, took a night to finish filming. Aerial shots required the use of Spidercams and cameras strapped onto remote control plane. Scenes set in the 1970s were, according to Neo, the hardest to film as the details were hard to perfect. Additionally, Neo had to specially get 1970s-era local army helmets due to MINDEF not having any in stock. Army uniforms set in that era could not be found; Neo instead purchased new sets of uniforms and dyed them until they reached the desired colour. About half a day was spent on set daily; filming in total took seventy days to finish in September 2012.

Effects
For the opening scenes, in which many landmarks in Singapore were destroyed, computer-generated imagery (CGI) was used to create the explosions. Neo's insistence to use real weapons and pyrotechnics for the shooting of the CGI-war sequences, despite the high cost, was due to him wanting to provide a "new feel" for the audience.

The film features Dolby Atmos surround sound, the first South-East Asian film to do so. The visual effects were done by Vividthree Productions Pte Ltd and spearheaded by VFX Director Jay Hong.

Music
The official theme song of Ah Boys to Men, titled "Recruits' Anthem", was written, composed and performed by Tosh Zhang, a YouTube personality, Actor and also one of the cast. Most of the song was written during filming in Pulau Tekong. Initially rejected by director Jack Neo twice, it was first uploaded on YouTube, accompanied with an official music video, prior to the release of the film. The official music video was uploaded on YouTube on October 20, 2012. Reception to "Recruits' Anthem" was overwhelmingly positive and within a month of its uploading, it grossed 610,000 hits. As of March 2014, "Recruit's Anthem" has grossed over 2,000,000 hits.

Release
Ah Boys to Men is the first two-part Singaporean film. Ah Boys to Men premiered on November 6, 2012 at the Golden Village Multiplex. It was first commercially released in Singapore on November 8, 2012 and it opened in Malaysian cinemas on December 20, 2012. Discussions with film distributors in Hong Kong and mainland China are ongoing. Both parts one and two will be showcased at the Hong Kong International Film & TV Market from March 18, 2013 to March 21, 2013.

The film will be premiered at the in89 Digital Cinema, Ximending, Taiwan, on April 10, 2013, as well as at Resorts World Manila's cinema some time in April.

Home media
Ah Boys to Men was released in DVD on January 25, 2013.

Marketing

Pay television rights
In December 2012, it was announced at the Asia TV Forum & Market and ScreenSingapore 2012 conference that STAR Chinese Movies had acquired pay television rights to Ah Boys to Men in certain territories in Southeast Asia, in a deal with Clover Films, one of the film's distributors and production companies, for an undisclosed price.

Merchandise

The cast and crew of Ah Boys to Men will be promoting and selling Camou Products, a variety of army-themed merchandise, all of which are made from old decommissioned army apparel. A comic book based on the film's first part, titled Ah Boys to Men 1 and published by Marshall Cavendish, has been released; the artwork was done by James Teo.

Reception

Critical response
Ah Boys to Men has received mixed reviews from critics. Derek Elley of Film Business Asia graded it at 6 out of 10 marks, praising it for its "superior production values" but noting that it "lost momentum" during the second half. Kwok Kar Peng of The New Paper commented on the lengthiness of the film, also expressing his opinion that it seemed like an advertisement for the Singapore Army, but added that it had "its good points". TODAYs Christopher Toh, gave the film 3 out of 5 stars and criticised the over-use of CGI "that makes Doctor Who blush" though he commended the acting skills of the lead cast. Vanessa Tai, also from TODAY, felt that some of the jokes in the film were "sexist" and concluded that it might create a bad impression for the SAF (Singapore Armed Forces). In response, Neo stated that the "sexist" jokes were existent within the Army and were common. Gary Chua, also from TODAY, in response to the review by Tai, voiced out his disagreement. He felt that the film had instead done the SAF proud. F Movie Mag'''s review took issue with its excessive length, as well as its sense of incompleteness, though it also praised the director, as well as the energetic performance of the actors. Travis Wong of inSing.com gave the movie 2 out of 5 stars, criticising the "obnoxious product placement" and the rehashing of past jokes. Hee En Ming of Fridae dubbed Ah Boys to Men as "possibly the worst boot camp comedy ever", reserving only negative feedback for it. At the National Day Rally 2012, Prime Minister Lee Hsien Loong complimented Neo on the film. Loong Wai Ting of Malaysia's New Straits Times ranked part one as number 10 on her list of Jack Neo's best movies. Maliki Osman lauded the film (as a whole) "for striking a chord in many Singaporeans, and in the process helping to strengthen Singaporeans' commitment to defence."

Box officeAh Boys to Men grossed S$6.18 million dollars domestically. It earned S$234,000 on its opening day and took the number one spot in its opening weekend, earning S$1,509,422 at the box office. It broke the record for the biggest opening weekend for local productions, a record previously held by Neo's earlier film Ah Long Pte Ltd (S$1.484 million) in 2008, as well as that for the biggest opening-day box-office result for a local film outside of the Chinese New Year season. The first Asian movie to top the Singapore box office since November 2011, it passed the S$5 million mark on November 29, 2012, the second Singaporean film to do so, and at that point of time became Singapore's second-highest-grossing film, overtaking the previous record holder, Money No Enough 2 (2008), which was also directed by Neo. On December 17, 2012, Ah Boys to Men became the highest-grossing Singaporean film, having already taken in S$6.03 million, surpassing Money No Enough (1998), the previous record holder and another work of Neo's. Neo said in response to the milestone: "I've waited 12 years to be able to make a film that can beat Money No Enough. I'm so glad that the day has finally come." Because of that, Neo said that he and the cast will skinny dip, tentatively in the Singapore River, as he had earlier promised. However, not all of the cast were comfortable with the prospect of skinny dipping. Tosh Zhang said he was a bit reluctant to do so, but would go along, seeing that majority would be doing so. The idea was later scrapped; Neo and the cast will instead be taking part in various charity-related events. Online box office revenue tracker Box Office Mojo has listed Ah Boys to Men as the fifth-highest-grossing film of 2012 in Singapore.

Home media
Ah Boys to Men was released in DVD on January 25, 2013. More than 50,000 units of the DVD for part one have been sold.

Sequels and spinoffs
The project had originally been envisaged as just two parts until after the release of the second part. Buoyed by "non-stop" requests for a third instalment, Jack Neo confirmed on February 20, 2013 that he had begun working on one under the working title Ah Boys to Men 3, though actual filming would only take place after 2013. Neo posted on his Twitter account (in Chinese):

In a later interview with Channel NewsAsia, Neo admitted that "I have been really reluctant to tell people that I'll be working on a third film, because I know people's expectations will only get higher after the first two." Neo said that he was still pondering on the storyline and also needed time for research. At a promotional tour in Kuala Lumpur, Malaysia, for part two, Neo announced that possible cast for part three included Henry Thia and Mark Lee and that "we are currently preparing for the shoot". During which he also "officially announced":

A spin-off to the Ah Boys to Men film franchise titled Ah Boys to Men 3: Frogmen'' was announced by Jack Neo to be scheduled for production in August 2014 based on the story of a group of navy boys.

See also
List of Singaporean films of 2012
Army Daze

Notes

References

External links

 
 

2012 films
2012 comedy-drama films
2010s English-language films
English-language Singaporean films
Hokkien-language films
2010s Mandarin-language films
Singaporean comedy films
Films directed by Jack Neo
Films shot in Singapore
Films set in Singapore
Films set in 2012
Films set in 2013
Films set in the 1970s
Films about armies
2012 multilingual films
Singaporean multilingual films